The Sulu velvetfish (Paraploactis  obbesi) is a species of marine ray-finned fish, a velvetfish belonging to the family Aploactinidae. This fish is found in the western Pacific Ocean.

References

External links
 

Aploactinidae
Fish described in 1913
Taxa named by Max Carl Wilhelm Weber